The 1938 British Empire Games was the third British Empire Games, the event that evolved to become the Commonwealth Games. Held in Sydney, Australia from 5–12 February 1938, they were timed to coincide with Sydney's sesqui-centenary (150 years since the foundation of British settlement in Australia). Venues included the Sydney Cricket Ground (the main stadium), the Sydney Sports Ground, North Sydney Olympic Pool and Henson Park. An estimated 40,000 people attended the opening ceremony. A competitors' residential village was established within the grounds of the Sydney Showground.

The star of the games was the Australian athlete Decima Norman, who won five gold medals in track and field. Margaret Dovey, later married to Australian prime minister Gough Whitlam, finished sixth in the 220 yards breaststroke.

Due to the onset of World War II, the games were not held again until 1950.

Participating teams

 
 
 
 
 
 
 
  India

Medals by country

Medals by event

Athletics

Boxing

Cycling

Track

Road

Diving

Men's events

Women's events

Lawn bowls

Rowing
All events were for men only. The double sculls competition was an invitation event and originally no medals were awarded nevertheless these medals were counted nowadays. The bronze medal is listed as won by New Zealand.

Swimming

Men's events

Women's events

Wrestling
All events were for men only.

See also 
 2000 Summer Olympics at Sydney, Australia

References

External links
 "Sydney 1938". Thecgf.com. Commonwealth Games Federation.
 "Results and Medalists—1938 British Empire Games". Thecgf.com. Commonwealth Games Federation.

 
Commonwealth Games in Australia
British Empire Games
British Empire Games
Sports competitions in Sydney
Commonwealth Games by year
1930s in Sydney
February 1938 sports events